Dino Toso (11 February 1969 – 13 August 2008)  was an Italian-Dutch engineer who worked as the Renault Formula One team's Director of Aerodynamics from  until June .

Career
Toso studied automotive design and electronics at Apeldoorn Technical College, followed by a degree in automotive engineering. He then obtained his master's degree in aerodynamics and flight at Cranfield University in the UK. He worked at NLR - Netherlands Aerospace Centre until 1995, when he was recruited by BMW for its GT racing programme. In  he moved to the Jordan F1 team, where he worked as a race engineer. His time at Jordan included its first win at the 1998 Belgian Grand Prix, where he engineered driver Damon Hill's victorious car. For the 2000 season, Toso was Jarno Trulli's race engineer. The pair would later reunite at Renault.

At the end of  he replaced the departing John Iley as Chief Aerodynamicist. He oversaw Jarno Trulli's only Grand Prix victory in 2004, before being part of the team that developed the R25 and R26 which won back to back Drivers and Constructors Championships. The team won seventeen  during his tenure, fourteen for Fernando Alonso, two for Giancarlo Fisichella and one for Jarno Trulli. In June 2008, Toso stepped down and retired from his role due to ill health.

Personal life
Toso was married to Nathalie, and had a daughter Isabella.  Toso was diagnosed with cancer in 2004. He continued to work whilst receiving treatment, but the illness was terminal. In August 2008, two months after retiring, he died at home at the age of 39. Former colleagues including Flavio Briatore, Eddie Jordan and Damon Hill attended his funeral.

References

1969 births
2008 deaths
Automotive engineers
Deaths from cancer in England
Dutch aerospace engineers
Dutch motorsport people
Formula One designers
Italian aerospace engineers
Italian motorsport people
Sportspeople from Delft
Renault people
Burials in Oxfordshire